Adler Da Silva Pereira (born 28 December 1998) is a Swiss professional footballer who currently plays for Slovan Bratislava in the Fortuna Liga.

Club career

Pohronie
In January 2021, Da Silva had signed a 1,5 year deal with Pohronie from Stade Nyon, with Slovak first division club having the option to make the transfer permanent.

Da Silva made his Fortuna Liga debut for Pohronie on 6 February 2021, in a fixture played at neutral ground at Štadión pod Dubňom, against Nitra. He was featured in the starting line-up and opened the score sheet of the match in the 13th minute by converting a penalty set after a Kilian Pagliuca's foul against David Bangala. While Nitra equalised before the half-time through Pagliuca, Pohronie regained the lead through Andrej Štrba ten minutes before the conclusion. Da Silva scored his second goal in stoppage time by converting a counter attack, following an assist by Alieu Fadera. Pohronie gained season's second win. Overall, Da Silva greatly contributed to Pohronie in avoiding relegation by scoring 6 league goals. He became the club's top scorer of the season, tied with James Weir.

At the start of 2021–22 season, Da Silva remained goal-less and began some of the fixtures from the bench. His position in the club was made more difficult through the arrival of Miloš Lačný.

Slovan Bratislava
On 2 September 2021, reigning champions Slovan Bratislava had announced Da Silva's signing, on a year-long loan, followed by an automatic obligation to buy. Da Silva was acquired as a prospective offensive player to aid the club ahead of Europa Conference League combined with domestic duties.

Honours
Slovan Bratislava
Fortuna Liga: 2021–22

References

External links
 FK Pohronie official club profile
 Futbalnet profile
 

1998 births
Living people
Footballers from Geneva
Swiss men's footballers
Swiss people of Brazilian descent
Swiss expatriate footballers
Switzerland youth international footballers
Association football forwards
Servette FC players
FC Zürich players
Étoile Carouge FC players
Grasshopper Club Zürich players
FC Sion players
FC Stade Nyonnais players
FK Pohronie players
ŠK Slovan Bratislava players
MFK Zemplín Michalovce players
2. Liga Interregional players
Swiss Promotion League players
Swiss Challenge League players
Swiss 1. Liga (football) players
Slovak Super Liga players
2. Liga (Slovakia) players
Swiss expatriate sportspeople in Slovakia
Expatriate footballers in Slovakia